Francis Key Pendleton (January 1, 1850 – July 26, 1930) was an American lawyer and judge who was prominent in New York society during the Gilded Age.

Early life
Pendleton was born in Cincinnati on January 1, 1850, and was known as Frank.  He was the son of George Hunt Pendleton and Mary Alicia (née Key) Pendleton.  Among his siblings were Sarah Pendleton, who was born in Ireland, Mary Lloyd Pendleton, Jane Francis Pendleton, and George Hunt Pendleton Jr., who died young.  His father, a former president of the Kentucky Central Railroad, served as a Democratic U.S. Representative and U.S. Senator of Ohio (where he was Chair of the Senate Democratic Caucus), as well as the U.S. Minister to Germany (during the Cleveland and Benjamin Harrison administrations).

His maternal grandparents were Mary Tayloe (née Lloyd) Key and Francis Scott Key, the lawyer, author, and amateur poet who is best known today for writing a poem which later became the lyrics for the United States' national anthem, "The Star-Spangled Banner", who was the himself, the son of prominent lawyer John Ross Key.  His paternal grandparents were Jane Frances (née Hunt) Pendleton and U.S. Representative Nathanael Greene Pendleton, was himself, the son of Nathaniel Pendleton, the Attorney General of Georgia.  His great-grandfather served as a second to Alexander Hamilton in his 1804 duel with Aaron Burr.

Pendleton prepared for college with Eugene F. Bliss in Cincinnati and then Harvard College, graduating in 1870.  He then, after spending three years abroad studying French and German, he attended Harvard Law School in 1875.

Career
After graduating from Harvard Law, Pendleton moved to New York City where he began practicing law with Parrish. In 1870, that firm was dissolved and he formed a partnership with E. Ellery Anderson and P.C. Anderson, known as Anderson, Pendleton & Anderson PC.

In 1907, Pendleton was appointed Corporation Counsel by the Democratic Mayor of New York City, George B. McClellan Jr., succeeding William B. Ellison.  He was later was appointed a justice of the Supreme Court of New York by Democratic Governor John Alden Dix.  He was reelected for a term ending on December 31, 1921.  He left the bench, effective April 1, 1920, stating: "I have had it in contemplation for a long time, but as I have a case on hand at trial and some judicial work to complete, I have set a date of severance with the judiciary at April 1. I intend to return to the practice of the law and will be at the head of the old firm of Pendleton, Anderson, Iselin & Riggs, with offices at 25 Broad Street."  His resignation caused a vacancy that was filled by Democratic Governor Al Smith.

Society life
In 1892, Pendleton and his wife were included in Ward McAllister's "Four Hundred", purported to be an index of New York's best families, published in The New York Times.  Conveniently, 400 was the number of people that could fit into Mrs. Astor's ballroom.  Pendleton was a member of the Knickerbocker Club, the Union Club of the City of New York, the Down Town Club, the Turf and Field Club, the City Midday Club, the Riding and Meadow Brook Club. He was also a vice-president of the Society of the Cincinnati, a hereditary society founded in 1783, to preserve the ideals and fellowship of officers of the Continental Army who served in the Revolutionary War.

Personal life

On July 1, 1885, Pendleton was married to Sarah "Sallie" Marié (1862–1886), daughter of Rachel (née Steward) and Camille Marié and the niece of Peter Marié. She died of pneumonia less than a year after their marriage on March 14, 1886.

On December 10, 1889, Pendleton was married to Elizabeth La Montagne (–1936). Elizabeth was the daughter of Augustus La Montagne, the sister of Kate La Montagne (wife of Columbia University president Nicholas Murray Butler), and granddaughter of New York property developer Thomas E. Davis.  Together, they were the parents of a son, George Hunt Pendleton, who was born in 1895, and who died in 1938.  His son, a hero of World War I who was decorated by King Albert I of Belgium, was married Katherine Wyman Porter in 1924.

Pendleton died in New York City on July 26, 1930. After a funeral at St. Thomas's Church, he was buried at Woodlawn Cemetery in the Bronx.

References

External links

 Pendleton Family Papers, 1775-1881 The Library of Virginia, Richmond, Virginia.

1850 births
1930 deaths
Harvard Law School alumni
New York (state) Democrats
New York (state) lawyers
19th-century American lawyers
20th-century American lawyers
20th-century American judges
New York Supreme Court Justices
People included in New York Society's Four Hundred
Harvard College alumni